GK (1957 - 20 September 2017) was an Indian film art director who worked in the Tamil film industry. He also worked as actor in films and television series.

Career
GK held a diploma in Fine Arts from the Madras College of Arts and Crafts. He received his first opportunity as an art director in Netaji's 1985 film, Janani. GK went on to work on over 200 Tamil films as an art director during his career. He won the Tamil Nadu State Film Award for Best Art Director award for his work in Sundar C's Arunachalam (1997). In a notable moment during the making of the film, GK quickly prepared a Lingam prop from a water pot when filming the "Adhandha Idhandha" song featuring Rajinikanth. He also worked on the sets of Kamal Haasan's Marudhanayagam in 1998.

His acting career included antagonistic dual roles in the television serial, Thangam, which ran between 2009 and 2013.

Death
He died aged 60 on 20 September 2017 at Apollo Hospitals in Chennai following heart ailments. He was survived by his wife Nageshwari, son Krishnakanth and daughter Hema.

Partial filmography

As art director

Avvai Shanmughi (1996)
Arunachalam (1997)
Baba (2002)
Thirupaachi (2005)
Chandramukhi (2005)
Sivakasi (2005)
Puli Vesham (2011)
Puthagam (2013)

As actor
Television
Kalasam (2008-2009)
Thangam (2009-2013)
Ganga (2017-2018)
Films
Arunachalam (1997) as film producer

References

External links

Indian art directors
Indian production designers
2017 deaths
20th-century Indian designers
Artists from Chennai
21st-century Indian designers
Tamil Nadu State Film Awards winners
Tamil male actors
Tamil male television actors
Tamil television presenters
Television personalities from Tamil Nadu
Male actors from Tamil Nadu
Male actors in Tamil cinema
1957 births